Hannes Fischer (23 December 1925 – 22 January 1989) was a German actor and stage director. He was the Artistic Director of the Staatsschauspiel Dresden.

References

1925 births
1989 deaths
German theatre directors
Actors from Dresden